Bairiya  is a village which come under Khairahani Municipality, ward no. 13,  in Chitwan in the Narayani Zone of south-eastern Nepal. At the time of the 1991 Nepal census it had a population of 2936 people living in 527 individual households. But it has increased due to more illiteracy. Most of the people are poor and under the line of poverty. The literacy rate has been also reduced.

Tourism 
Bairiya is neighbour of shaura here people come mainly from Sauraha  to visit Kumroj Community Forest via jeep safari

Tourism place 

 Hatti counter
 Kumroj Community Forest
 Boating on Dhungre khola

Sports 
Every year there is a big taekwondo and football competition here on bairiya ground.

Some past event 

 Khairahani football Championship 2020
 Chitwan Taekwondo Championship 2021

References

Populated places in Chitwan District